Georgetown Independent School District is a public school district based in Georgetown, Texas (USA).   The district, covering 180.3 square miles, has just over 10,000 students based on recent studies.

In addition to Georgetown, the district serves the city of Weir as well as the communities of Serenada and Walburg.

In 2009, the school district was rated "academically acceptable" by the Texas Education Agency.

Schools

High schools

Grades 9–12
 East View High School
 Georgetown High School

Grades 10–12
 Richarte High School

Grades 6–12
 Georgetown Alternative Program (Discipline Alternative Education Program)

Grades 4–12
 Williamson County Juvenile Justice Center (Juvenile Justice Alternative Education Program)

Middle schools

Grades 6-8

 Douglas  Benold Middle School
 Charles A Forbes Middle School
 James  Tippit Middle School
 George Wagner Middle School

Elementary schools

Grades K-5

George Washington Carver Elementary School
Patricia Webb  Cooper Elementary School
Jo Ann Ford Elementary School.  
Jack Frost Elementary School
Raye McCoy Elementary School
James E Mitchell Elementary School
Dell Pickett Elementary School closing 2020
AnnePurl Elementary School 
Village Elementary School

Planned schools
Wolf Ranch Elementary School fall (2020)
Everett L. Williams Elementary School fall (2020)

Georgetown ISD Athletic Complex
The district opened up a brand new athletic complex in 2008 with addition of an approximately $11 million multipurpose stadium that seats appx 12,500.  The field, named for former GHS football coach Bernard Birklebach, is Field Turf artificial turf. The complex already includes softball and baseball fields, tennis courts and a separate track facility.

Alternative Campuses 
Grades 10-12
Richarte High School
Grades 6-12
Georgetown Alternative Program

References

External links 
Georgetown ISD

School districts in Williamson County, Texas
Greater Austin